The LGV Sud Europe Atlantique (LGV SEA, English : South Europe Atlantic High Speed Rail Line), also known as the LGV Sud-Ouest or LGV L'Océane, is a high-speed railway line between Tours and Bordeaux, in France. It is used by TGV trains operated by SNCF. It is an extension of the LGV Atlantique. The line was inaugurated on 28 February 2017 and with services beginning on 2 July 2017. The line, which was at the time the biggest European railway construction project, was built by the LISEA consortium, which owns and maintains the line until 2061 and charges tolls to train companies. Trains on this line depart Paris from Gare Montparnasse.

Purpose 

The LGV SEA brings high-speed rail service to southwestern France and connects the regions of Nouvelle-Aquitaine and Occitanie with the high-speed rail service of Northern Europe, which connects Paris to London, Brussels, Amsterdam and beyond. The inter-city links between Tours, Poitiers, Angoulême, and Bordeaux are also improved, and southwestern France is better connected to various parts of the country and to the rest of Europe. Trains on this line depart Paris from Gare Montparnasse

The project is also a response to the heavy traffic on the existing rail line. Train tracks are most efficiently used when all trains circulate at the same speed and have identical stops. This congested the tracks and prevented their most efficient usage.

Dedicated tracks for the TGV therefore leave space on the existing tracks for many more freight and TER trains than just the number of removed TGV trains. New regional TER services became possible, and could ease services that are currently crowded. The increase in freight trains on the existing track would ease truck traffic on the roads in the régions, as trains transport more and more goods, easing the impact on the environment as well.

The project was also sold as benefiting the economy. The construction of Phase 1 created 10,000 construction jobs for five years. Jobs in the transport, commerce, and service sectors were created as well. Local businesses may their see competitiveness increase as their markets expand, and tourism to the region may increase as well.

This route supplements – and partly supersedes – the classic Paris–Bordeaux railway line.

Details 
The line was built by consortium LISEA consisting of Vinci Concessions - 33.4%, Caisse des dépôts et consignations - 25.4%, Meridiam - 22.0% and Ardian - 19.2%. The consortium will operate and maintain the line until 2061, and charges tolls to train companies. The consortium invested €3.8 billion, French government, local authorities and the European Union paid €3 billion and €1 billion was contributed by SNCF Réseau (subsidiary of SNCF). Another €1.2 billion was spent by SNCF Réseau on the construction of interconnecting lines, control centres, capacity enhancements at Bordeaux and remodelling the track layout at Gare Montparnasse.

The new high-speed route bypasses Libourne, shortening the total distance traveled compared to the existing route. No new stations were built between Saint-Pierre-des-Corps and Bordeaux, and service to Châtellerault, Poitiers and Angoulême uses their existing train stations, which new connections link to the high-speed rails. South of Poitiers, a connection allows trains to access the old tracks towards La Rochelle.

The journey between Tours and Bordeaux is shortened by around 50 minutes.  of high-speed track was built together with a further  of conventional tracks that connect to the LGV. The new line is expected to increase annual ridership by about five million travellers.

Phases 

For financial reasons, the project was initially divided into three phases:

Phase 1: Angoulême–Bordeaux 

2001–2003: Pre-project studies and procedures
3 February 2005 – 16 March 2005: Final public hearings
Start of 2012: Construction starts
31 July 2017: In service

Phase 2: Tours–Angoulême 
 2004–2006: Pre-project studies and procedures
 2009: Preliminary works and land acquisition
 Start of 2012: Main construction starts
 2 July 2017: In service

In that initial plan, Phase 2 had to be completed on a rapid schedule to cope with the increase in traffic expected after the opening of Phase 1. For this reason the French government announced additional funding in February 2009 to build Phases 1 and 2 together.

Phase 3: Bordeaux – Toulouse and Spanish border 

 Proposed, not currently decided
 2004–2005: Preliminary studies
 2006: Public debate

On 30 July 2010, the French government announced that work on the section to the Spanish border was expected to begin before 2020. In 2015 however, a public inquiry rejected the construction of this section due to cost.

The Bordeaux - Toulouse high speed line could be opened in 2029.

History 

25 September 1990: Service began on the south-west branch of the LGV Atlantique to Saint-Pierre-des-Corps, west of Tours
1 April 1992: Initial proposals for a high-speed link between Saint-Pierre-des-Corps and Bordeaux. Early in its conception, the line was going to be called LGV Aquitaine.
1994–1995: Public debate on the LGV Aquitaine project
1997–1998: Preliminary studies on the Tours to Bordeaux line
2011: A 50-year concession to build and operate the line is awarded to the LISEA consortium.
1st quarter 2012: Construction begins, expected to last 73 months (until 1st quarter 2017)
28 February 2017: Inauguration of the line
2 July 2017: Line opens commercially

References

External links 
 Large parts of this article were translated from the article LGV Sud Europe Atlantique on the French language Wikipedia.

Sud Europe Atlantique
Railway lines opened in 2017
2017 establishments in France